The women's heptathlon event at the 2013 Summer Universiade was held on 10–11 July.

Medalists

Results

100 metres hurdles
Wind:Heat 1: +1.8 m/s, Heat 2: +0.8 m/s, Heat 3: +1.6 m/s

High jump

Shot put

200 metres
Wind:Heat 1: +0.8 m/s, Heat 2: -0.2 m/s, Heat 3: +2.7 m/s

Long jump

Javelin throw

800 metres

Final standings

References

Heptathlon
2013 in women's athletics
2013